David Williams was born on October 3, 1965. He is a native of Minnesota.  Williams won the Minnesota State Junior and Senior Championships in Judo numerous times before the age of 17. He attended and Wrestled at Iowa State University and transferred to San Jose State University in 1985,  where he earned a degree in International Business, minoring in French and Japanese. After completion of his first degree he moved to Tokai University in Kanegawa, Japan, where he trained on and off until the Olympic Trials in '96. Later he completed a Masters in Intercultural Communications in 2003. He was a national and international competitor in Judo.  His last known rank is Ryokudan. His most recent win was at the US National Championships in Judo, 1996.  Though he attempted to join the Olympic Team for the United States, he earned the alternate spot to Jimmy Pedro when he placed second in the 71 kg division.  He was selected as the Olympic Alternate.  He has had a 23-year competitive career. He also has worked as a Physical Education Professor at San Jose State University, where he just completed his 20th year of service to the California State University system.   In 2015, he became the first Black IJF-A Referee in USA Judo history.

References

External links
 http://www.bayareaadvocare.com

American male judoka
Living people
Judoka trainers
Tokai University alumni
1965 births
Sportspeople from Minnesota
Judo referees